Michael 'Mike' Robert Makin (born 1962), is a male former athlete who competed for England.

Athletics career
Makin represented England in the triple jump event, and won a silver medal at the 1986 Commonwealth Games in Edinburgh, Scotland.

He won the bronze medal at the nationals in 1986 and 1988 during the AAA Championships.

References

1962 births
Living people
Commonwealth Games medallists in athletics
Commonwealth Games silver medallists for England
Athletes (track and field) at the 1986 Commonwealth Games
British male triple jumpers
English male triple jumpers
Medallists at the 1986 Commonwealth Games